The Securities and Futures Bureau (SFB) is the agency of Financial Supervisory Commission of the Taiwan (ROC) that administers and supervises the securities issuance, securities trading and futures trading, facilitates national economic development, protects investors' interests and develops the futures market and maintains futures trading orders in Taiwan.

Organizational structure
 Corporate Finance Division
 Securities Firms Division
 Securities Trading Division
 Securities Investment Trust and Consulting Division
 Accounting and Auditing Supervision Division
 Futures Trading Division
 Information Systems Office
 Personnel Office
 Accounting Office
 Civil Service Ethics Office

Director-generals
Lee Chi-hsien
Huang Tien-mu
 Wu Yui-chun
 Wang Yung-hsin
 Chang Chen-shan

Transportation
SFB is accessible within walking distance south of Zhongxiao Xinsheng Station of Taipei Metro.

See also
 Financial Supervisory Commission (Taiwan)
 Economy of Taiwan

References

External links
 

Executive Yuan
Financial regulatory authorities
Independent government agencies of Taiwan
Regulation in Taiwan
Finance in Taiwan